4 Scorpii is a single star in the southern zodiac constellation of Scorpius. With an apparent visual magnitude of +5.6, it is dimly visible to the naked eye under good viewing conditions.

The stellar classification of 4 Scorpii is A3 V, indicating this is an ordinary A-type main-sequence star. It has 2.6 times the mass of the Sun and is radiating around 92 times the Sun's luminosity from its photosphere at an effective temperature of about 8,356 K.

References

A-type main-sequence stars
Scorpius (constellation)
Durchmusterung objects
Scorpii, 04
142445
077984
5917

fr:1 Scorpii